Hobart is the given name of:
               
Hobart Alter (1933-2014), a founding pioneer in the surfboard shaping industry, creator of the Hobie Cat, and founder of the Hobie company
Hobart R. Alter (1897-1984), American politician
Hobart Baumann Amstutz (1896–1980), a bishop of the American Methodist Church and the United Methodist Church
Hobart Hobey Baker (1892-1918), American hockey and football player, member of several hockey halls of fame
Hobart B. Bigelow (1834–1891), American politician and 50th Governor of Connecticut
Hobart Bosworth (1867–1943), American film actor, director, writer, and producer
Hobart Brown (1934-2007), American sculptor
John Henry Hobart Brown (1831-1888), American Episcopal bishop who went by the name Hobart
Hobart Cavanaugh (1886-1950), American character actor
Hobart Chatfield-Taylor (1865-1945), American writer, novelist, and biographer                                   
Hobart Freeman (1920–1984), American charismatic preacher and author who advocated faith healing
Hobart R. Gay (1894-1983), US Army lieutenant general
Hobart Henley (1887-1964), American silent film actor, director, and screenwriter
Hobart Krum (1833–1914), American lawyer and politician
Hobart Smith (1897—1965), American old-time musician
Hobart Muir Smith (1912-2013), American herpetologist
Hobart Upjohn (1876–1949), American architect

Masculine given names